Alonzo Bowman (June 15, 1848 – October 4, 1885) was a United States Army Sergeant during the Indian Wars who received the Medal of Honor on November 4, 1882, for bravery at Cibicu Creek, Arizona, on August 30, 1881.

Medal of Honor citation
Citation:
Conspicuous and extraordinary bravery in attacking mutinous scouts.

See also

List of Medal of Honor recipients

References

1848 births
1885 deaths
People from Knox County, Maine
United States Army soldiers
American military personnel of the Indian Wars
United States Army Medal of Honor recipients
American Indian Wars recipients of the Medal of Honor